Ozell Sutton (December 13, 1925 – December 19, 2015) was among the first Black members of the U.S. Marine Corps.

Sutton was born just outside the town of Gould, Lincoln County, Arkansas. His family moved to Little Rock, Arkansas and he graduated from Dunbar High Scnool. Sutton received his undergraduate degree in 1950 from Philander Smith College. Sutton worked at the Little Rock Democrat newspaper. In 1962, he received an honorary doctorate from Philander Smith in recognition of his political activism in the civil rights movement.

He marched with Martin Luther King Jr. in 1963 in the historic March on Washington D.C., and in 1965 in the Selma to Montgomery marches.
 
Sutton worked for Arkansas Governor Winthrop Rockefeller as the director of the Governor's Council on Human Resources. He is a founding member of the executive board of the National Center for Missing and Exploited Children. Sutton moved to Atlanta, Georgia where he worked for the United States Department of Justice Community Relations Service.

Sutton was the 26th General President of Alpha Phi Alpha fraternity. As president, he was named one of the 100 most influential Black Americans by Ebony magazine.

In 2012, he was presented with the Congressional Gold Medal from President Barack Obama for being among the first Black members of the U.S. Marine Corps. He died in Atlanta on December 19, 2015, at the age of 90.

Footnotes

References

1925 births
2015 deaths
Alpha Phi Alpha presidents
People from Lincoln County, Arkansas
People from Atlanta
Philander Smith College alumni
African-American United States Navy personnel
Journalists from Arkansas
United States Marines
20th-century African-American people
21st-century African-American people